Paddy Bushe is an Irish poet.

Life
Paddy Bushe (Paddy de Buis) was born in Dublin in 1948. He lives in Waterville, County Kerry.

He writes poetry in both English and Irish.  He has also translated Chinese poems into English and Irish. In addition, he has translated some of the poems by Sorley MacLean from Scottish Gaelic into Irish.

Works

Poetry
 Poems With Amergin (Dublin, Beaver Row Press, 1989)
 Teanga (Baile Átha Cliath, Coiscéim, 1990)
 Counsellor (Kerry, Sceilg Press, 1991)
 Digging Towards The Light (Dublin, Dedalus Press, 1994)
 In Ainneoin na gCloch (Coiscéim, 2001)
 Hopkins on Skellig Michael (Dublin, Dedalus Press, 2001)
 The Nitpicking of Cranes (Dedalus, 2004)
 To Ring in Silence, new and selected poems (Dedalus, 2008)
 My Lord Buddha of Carraig Eanna (Dedalus Press, 2012).

Awards
 Member, Aosdána
 2006: Oireachtas na Gaeilge prize for poetry
 2006: Michael Hartnett Poetry Award
 2016: The Irish Times Poetry Now Award for On A Turning Wing (Dedalus 2016)

See also
 List of Irish writers

References

Aosdána members
20th-century Irish male writers
21st-century Irish male writers
Irish poets
Writers from Dublin (city)
1947 births
Living people